The Whisky Creek Cabin is a rustic log cabin located in southwest Oregon along the section of the Rogue River that is designated as a National Wild and Scenic River.  It is the oldest remaining mining cabin in the Rogue River canyon.  The Bureau of Land Management purchased the cabin and surrounding property in 1973.  The Whisky Creek Cabin is listed on the National Register of Historic Places in 1975.

History 

The Whisky Creek Cabin was built in about 1880 by an unknown miner. The original structure was very basic, consisting of four walls, a dirt floor, and wooden shake roof. A flume ditch was constructed near the cabin around 1890 to provide water for hydraulic mining on Whisky Creek. The flume begins about one half mile up the stream from the cabin and ends at the gully behind the tool shed. This flume ditch also provided drinking water for the cabin.

The first recorded mining claim on Whisky Creek was filed by P.H Rushmore in 1917.  Rushmore sold his claim to Cy Whiteneck a year later.  Whiteneck lived at Whisky Creek for the next 30 years.  During that time, he improved the original cabin by laying a wooden floor and adding a second room.  He also constructed several work sheds near the cabin.  Over the years, Whiteneck used hydraulic mining methods to extract gold from the creek, but never got rich.

In 1948, Whiteneck sold his claim to L. M. Nichols and his wife. In 1957, Nichols hired Lou Martin to be the property's caretaker. Martin continued to mine Whisky Creek during the sixteen years he lived there. He also improved the site. Martin built a solar-heated shower adjacent to one of the sheds and added a large walk-in pantry next to the cabin. Martin also constructed a cable car to haul firewood across the creek. Martin remained the on-site caretaker until 1973 when the property was sold to the Bureau of Land Management.

In 1973, Bureau of Land Management installed interpretive signs at the site and opened the cabin to the public for self-guided tours.  Because of cabin's unique heritage as the oldest surviving mining cabin in the Rogue River Canyon, the Whisky Creek Cabin was listed on the National Register of Historic Places on 5 September 1975.  The historic area cover  and includes the cabin and one additional contributing structure.

Structure 

Because of its isolated location, the cabin has changed very little since its last resident left in 1973.  It is a one-story log cabin with two rooms and an adjacent pantry.  The cabin has two long porches that run the length of the building in the front and back.  The porches are held up by log posts.  The cabin's floor is made of fir planking, and the roof is corrugated sheet-metal.  The pantry has a double-wall with sawdust insulation in between the inner and outer walls.

There are two sheds on the site.  There is a large tool shed just behind the cabin.  A power generator shed is located a short distance north of the cabin.  There is a unique solar-heated shower, built by the cabin's last resident, located between the tool shed and the cabin.

Access 

The Whisky Creek Cabin historic site is located in the Rogue River canyon in southern Oregon. It is an isolated site within the Rogue National Wild and Scenic River corridor, surrounded by the Rogue River-Siskiyou National Forest.
 
The Grave Creek trailhead is  past the ranger station.

The Whisky Creek Cabin can only be reached by floating down the Rogue River or by hiking the Rogue River canyon trail.  From the trailhead at Grave Creek, it is a three-mile (5 km) hike to the cabin along the Rogue River National Recreation Trail.  The cabin is approximately one quarter mile up Whisky Creek from its mouth on the north side of the Rogue River.  Information on the river trail is available at the Smullin Visitor Center at the Rand Ranger Station.  There is also a boat ramp at Grave Creek.  Rogue River float permits can be obtained at the Rand visitor center as well.

Whisky Creek Cabin is a popular stop for both hikers and boaters.  There is a primitive campground located at the mouth of Whisky Creek.  There are public restrooms at the campground.  Water is available from Whisky Creek; however, some form of water purification is recommended before drinking.  Leave no trace procedures apply while camping and cooking along the Wild and Scenic River corridor.  Fire pans are also required within  of the river.

References

External links 
Bureau of Land Management – Oregon State Office
Rogue River-Siskiyou National Forest

Houses on the National Register of Historic Places in Oregon
Houses completed in 1880
Houses in Josephine County, Oregon
Bureau of Land Management areas in Oregon
Log cabins in the United States
Protected areas of Josephine County, Oregon
National Register of Historic Places in Josephine County, Oregon
1880 establishments in Oregon
Log buildings and structures on the National Register of Historic Places in Oregon